The following is a timeline of the history of the city of Hama, Syria.

Prior to 7th century

 11th century BCE – Town is "capital of Aramean kingdom of Hamath."
 854 BCE – Town taken by Assyrian Shalmaneser II.
 743 BCE – Assyrians in power again.
 740 BCE – Uprising.
 720 BCE – Uprising "crushed by Sargon."
 540 BCE – Persians in power (approximate date).
 64 BCE – Town becomes part of the Roman province of Syria.

7th–19th centuries
 639 CE – Town taken by Arab Muslim Abu Ubaidah ibn al-Jarrah.
 637 – Great Mosque built.
 10th century – Hamdanids in power.
 968 – Town sacked by Byzantine forces of Nicephorus Phocas.
 11th century – Town sacked by Mirdasid forces.
 1108 – Tancred, Prince of Galilee takes town.
 1114 – Seljuks in power.
 1157 – Earthquake.
 1172 – Nur al-Din Mosque built.
 1175 – Saladin takes town from Zangids.
 1178 – Al-Muzaffar I Umar becomes Emir of Hama.
 1191 – Al-Mansur I Muhammad becomes Emir of Hama.
 1221 – Al-Nasir Kilij Arslan becomes Emir of Hama.
 1229 – Al-Muzaffar II Mahmud becomes Emir of Hama.
 1244 – Al-Mansur Muhammad II becomes Emir of Hama.
 1260 – Town sacked by Mongols.
 1284 – Al-Muzaffar III Mahmud becomes Emir of Hama.
 1299 – Mamluks in power.
 1310 – Ayyubid Abu al-Fida becomes Emir of Hama.
 1323 – al-Izzi Mosque built.
 1326 – Abu'l-Fida Mosque built.
 1331 – Al-Afdal Muhammad becomes Emir of Hama.
 1400 – Timurlane takes town.
 1453 – al-Mamunye (water wheel) constructed.
 1516 – Ottoman Turks in power.
 1556 – Khan Rustum Pasha (caravansary) built.
 1742 – Azm Palace built.
 1858 – Population: 30,000.
 1864 – Town becomes capital of the Hamah sanjak (district) in the Vilayet of Sham.
 1875 – Cholera outbreak.
 1898 – Public library opens (approximate date).

20th century

 1901 – Population: 45,000 (approximate).
 1902 – Rayak-Hama railway begins operating.
 1906 – Aleppo-Hama railway constructed.
 1917 – Shaker al-Hanbali becomes mayor.
 1918 – Town becomes part of French Mandate of Syria.
 1925 – 1925 Hama uprising, early October uprising by Hama's inhabitants led by Fawzi al-Qawuqji against the French mandate, subsequent crackdown by French forces. Part of the Great Syrian Revolt.
 1930 – Population: 60,000.
 1941 – Al-Taliya Sport Club formed.
 1945 – Al-Nawair Sport Club formed.
 1946 – City becomes part of independent Syrian Republic.
 1960 – Population: 97,390.
 1963 – April: Anti-Baathist demonstrations.
 1964
 April: Conflict between Muslim Brotherhood and Baath leaders.
 Population: 131,630 (estimate).
 1970 – Population: 137,421.
 1980 – February: Islamist uprising 
 1981 – April: 1981 Hama massacre.
 1982 – February: Muslim Brotherhood uprising against Hafez al-Asad government; crackdown.
 1985 – Population: 193,610 (estimate).
 1989 – Apamea Cham Palace Hotel built.

21st century

 2003 – Population: 427,369 (estimate).
 2008 – Population: 1,508,000 (estimate).
 2011
 15 March–3 July: Mass demonstrations.
 3 July–4 August: Army crackdown on protesters.
September–December: Hama Governorate clashes
 2012 
14 April: City under full SAA control
25 April: Explosion in Mashaa Attayar.
 2012/13 
Autumn–spring: Rebels in control of Hamidiyah, Tariq Halab and Al-Arbain neighbourhoods
 2013 
25 April–15 June: Rest of the city captured by SAA during 2013 Hama offensive.

See also
 Timelines of other cities in Syria: Aleppo, Damascus, Homs, Latakia

References

Bibliography

Published in 19th century
 
 
 
 

Published in 20th century
 
 
 
 

Published in 21st century

External links

Years in Syria
 
Hama